Sandrine Blancke (born 6 November 1978) is a Belgium French actress. She started her acting career as a child actor at the age of 13 in the 1991 film Toto le héros. She was nominated for Best Supporting Actress at the 1st Magritte Awards.

Filmography 
 Toto le héros (1991)
 The Return of Casanova (1992)
 Shadow of a Doubt (1993)
 Soeur Sourire (2009)
 Arrêtez-moi là (2016)

External links

1979 births
Belgian child actresses
Living people
People from Uccle